Below are the full rosters, including the coaching staffs, of all current Nippon Professional Baseball teams.

Central League

Pacific League

See also
Nippon Professional Baseball rosters
List of current Major League Baseball team rosters
List of current KBO League team rosters

External links
 Nippon Professional Baseball announcement 2022 - NPB.jp 
 Registration and deregistration of participating players - NPB.jp 
 Teams index - NPB.jp

Nippon Professional Baseball
Nippon Professional Baseball
Nippon Professional Baseball